Mwana Africa FC is a Zimbabwean football club based in Bindura. Their home stadium is Trojan Mine Stadium.

Achievements
CBZ Cup: 1
 2006
Nestlé Charity Shield: 1
 2007

Performance in CAF competitions
CAF Confederation Cup: 1 appearance
2007 – Intermediate Round

Squad

Football clubs in Zimbabwe
Bindura